The Taliabu myzomela (Myzomela wahe) is a species of bird in the honeyeater family. It was first described in 2020. The species was named after the village of Wahe on Taliabu Island, which is the gateway to the highest elevations on Taliabu where it most commonly occurs.

This myzomela has thus far only been found on the island of Taliabu within the Sula Archipelago. On Taliabu, it has been recorded from sea level to 1,300m and it presumably occurs further up all the way to the highest elevation at ~1,415m. The species inhabits forest canopy and edge habitat, and is a nectarivore and frugivore that has been photographed feeding at flowers.

References

Taliabu myzomela
Taliabu myzomela
Endemic fauna of Indonesia
Birds of the Maluku Islands